Sollia is a hiking lodge along the Vinjefjorden in the municipality of Heim in Trøndelag county, Norway.

A hikers' trail goes steep uphill at first, through woods of spruce and birch, up to barren mountain moorland, interspersed with a few evergreens, mountain birches, rocks, in a heather-moss-lichen-coloured setting. The 3-hour-long moderately difficult hike goes along a marked mountain ridge trail, passing small lakes and streams, a few private cabins, and offering views of the fjord far below and the surrounding mountain areas. Sollia is one of several small self-service lodges in the Fjordruta hiking trail, operated by KNT, a part of the hikers’ association of the Kristiansund and Nordmøre area.

The Sollia lodge overlooks the Vinjefjorden from  up the mountain. The small lodge itself, accommodating a maximum of 15-20 hikers, is a restored (finished in 2003) cow/sheep barn of an old mountain dairy farm with its stone walls intact offering an overnight stay in candlelit and fireplace-warming evening atmosphere.

From Sollia, hikers can visit other lodges such as Storfiskhytta to the north and Storlisetra to the south (across the fjord) are nearby.

Media gallery

References

External links
http://www.turistforeningen.no/trail.php?tr_code=tnm47
http://www.kntur.no/
http://www.adressa.no/nyheter/article58957.ece

Heim, Norway
Hiking trails in Norway